The National Government Offices Administration (abbreviated as ) is an agency directly under the State Council of People's Republic of China. It manages the offices for the central government and various national agencies in Beijing. It is responsible for government procurement, government employees housing, state-sponsored conferences and other matters regarding logistics.

History
The administration is established in December 1950, as in Government Offices Administration of the Government Administration Council of the Central People's Government.
After the 1954 Constitution was passed, following a re-structuring of the government, it became the Government Offices Administration of the State Council().
In March 2013, the name is changed to National Government Offices Administration.

References 

Government of China